The 1965–66 Mexican Segunda División was the 16th season of the Mexican Segunda División. The season started on 29 May 1965 and concluded on 19 December 1965. It was won by Nuevo León, for the first time, the champion was defined in a tiebreaker match, in which Nuevo León defeated Tampico with a score of 2-1.

Changes 
 Ciudad Madero was promoted to Primera División.
 Nacional was relegated from Primera División.
 Chapingo Texcoco was renamed again as Texcoco.

Teams

League table

Results

Tiebreaker Match 
Due to the tie on points between Tampico and Nuevo León it was necessary to hold a tiebreaker match at a neutral venue. This was held on 26 December 1965 at the Estadio La Martinica, León.

References 

1965–66 in Mexican football
Segunda División de México seasons